Jim Fitzpatrick is an American sound engineer. He won a Primetime Emmy Award in the category Outstanding Sound Mixing for his work on for the episode "Road to the North Pole" of the television program Family Guy, sharing the award with Patrick S. Clark. Fitzpatrick has been nominated for six more, including two nominations for his work on the television program The Simpsons.

References

External links 

Living people
Place of birth missing (living people)
Year of birth missing (living people)
American audio engineers
Primetime Emmy Award winners
20th-century American engineers
21st-century American engineers